Loser like Me may refer to:

"Loser like Me" (Glee episode), episode of American television series Glee
"Loser like Me" (song), song performed by the cast of Glee